Emilia Pikkarainen (born 11 October 1992) is a Finnish swimmer. She holds the Finnish record in 50 metres butterfly (26.90), 100 metres butterfly (59.02), 200 metres butterfly (2:10.89), and 200 metres individual medley (2:14.23).

Born in Vantaa, Pikkarainen took part in the 2008 Olympics, aged 15, she competed in the 100 m butterfly and swam 1:02.31, ranking 46th. In the 2012 Olympics she competed in the 100 and 200 metres butterfly and the 200 metres individual medley. In the 2016 Olympics she competed as part of the Finnish team in the 4 × 100 metre medley relay.

She had been in a relationship with Formula 1 driver Valtteri Bottas since 2010. The couple married in September 2016 at St. John's Church, Helsinki. On 28 November 2019, Valtteri Bottas announced their separation and divorce, citing "challenges my career and life situation bring".

References

1992 births
Finnish female butterfly swimmers
Finnish female medley swimmers
Olympic swimmers of Finland
Swimmers at the 2008 Summer Olympics
Swimmers at the 2012 Summer Olympics
Swimmers at the 2016 Summer Olympics
Living people
Sportspeople from Vantaa
Racing drivers' wives and girlfriends